Ray Baxter (born 24 February 1940) is a former Australian rules footballer who played with Footscray in the Victorian Football League (VFL)

Recruited locally, from Kingsville, Baxter was a follower and key position player. He topped Footscray's goal-kicking in the 1959 VFL season, with 35 goals, six of which came in a loss to Essendon at Windy Hill. His efforts were rewarded with selection in that year's Victorian team which played Tasmania. He was the club's leading goal-kicker again in 1960, managing 37 goals, the seventh biggest tally in the league that season. Playing as a centre half-back, Baxter was a member of the Footscray team which won the 1963 Night Premiership.

Ray continued in footy, by being both Captain and Coach of Mordialloc from 1965 to 1967. He was awarded Best & Fairest in both 1965 & 1966.

Ray was successful in his career after football, being employed by Mazda in 1963, and becoming general manager by 1979. In 1987, he brought Lease Plan to Australia as the Managing Director. Ray was appointed Lease Plan Chairman for Australia & New Zealand in 1997, he held this position until his retirement in 2002.

Ray always continued working with the Footscray Football Club (eventually the Western Bulldogs). He was Vice President Of WBFC (Western Bulldogs Football Club) Board from 1996 to 2001. Ray Baxter is currently a Director of the Forever Foundation (est. 1999) and is also Chairman and Trustee of the Western Bulldogs Society (Bequests).

Darren Baxter, his son, would also play for Footscray.

References
http://www.foreverfoundation.com.au/about-us/

External links
 
 

1940 births
Australian rules footballers from Victoria (Australia)
Western Bulldogs players
Living people